The 2010 Islington Council election took place on 6 May 2010 to elect members of Islington London Borough Council in London, England. The whole council was up for election and the Labour party gained overall control of the council from no overall control.

Election result

Ward results

References

2010
2010 London Borough council elections
May 2010 events in the United Kingdom